Mylène Troszczynski (born 16 May 1972) was a National Front Member of the European Parliament representing North-West France. She was an MEP 2014-2019.

In 2018, Troszczynski was ordered by the European General Court to repay €56,554 that she claimed in expenses to pay a parliamentary assistant to perform tasks unrelated to her duties.

Personal life
Troszczynski is the daughter of a banker and an accountant, granddaughter of a Polish immigrant. She studied history at the University of Reims Champagne-Ardenne.

References

1972 births
Living people
MEPs for North-West France 2014–2019
National Rally (France) MEPs
French people of Polish descent
People from Aisne